Many of the world's radio stations broadcast in a variety of analog and digital formats.  This page will list and compare them in chart form.


Table

References

Broadcast engineering
Radio technology